La Ferrassie is an archaeological site in Savignac-de-Miremont, in the Dordogne department, France.  The site, located in the Vézère valley, consists of a large and deep cave flanked by two rock shelters within a limestone cliff, under which there is a scree slope formation.

Age

Artifacts found at the site are the productions of Mousterian (300,000-30,000 BP), Aurignacian (45,000–35,000 BP), and Périgordian (35,000–20,000 BP) cultures.  The cave area contains Gravettian (32,000–22,000 BP) objects and the scree contains objects from all these ages as well as the Châtelperronian (35,000-29,000 PB).  The site was abandoned during the Gravettian period (27 kya). Complex Mousterian burial structures found at La Ferrasie finally provided the evidence of Neanderthal burial practice.

Exploration history
A small area of the site was initially investigated by M. Tabanou in 1896, a teacher who died of a landslide at the Badegoule rock shelter shortly thereafter.  Denis Peyrony and Louis Capitan explored the site in 1905, 1907 and 1912; Peyrony in 1934, Henri Delporte in 1969 and 1984, and Delporte with Tuffreau in 1984.

Fossils
At least seven Neanderthals have been found in La Ferrassie, including infants and one fetus. All specimens were found in a thin 60 cm archaeological layer dated to 74-68 thousand years ago.

Notes

References

  
  
  
  
  
  
  
  

1896 archaeological discoveries
Archaeological sites in France
Mousterian
Neanderthal sites